Batter bread is bread made with a substantial liquid-to-flour ratio, so that the dough is a batter.  It is known for its ease of preparation.

Batter bread is a staple food of the American South.  Batter bread can be made with wheat flour, cornmeal or corn flour, or both.  A recipe for batter bread appears in The Virginia Housewife by Mary Randolph.  Sally Lunn, Johnny cake, corn pone, and pancakes are well-known batter breads.

References

Quick breads
Types of food